Opportunities for Latino Americans (i.e. those people who are or have family ancestry from Latin America) in the film industry, often mirrors the opportunities, and challenges, facing people of other racial or ethnic identities who work in the industry, behind or in front of the film camera. Historically, actors or actresses of Latino ancestry often found work within certain stereotypical roles, which often reflected broader social attitudes and cultural biases.

Latino men were frequently depicted as being highly aggressive and also with low levels of emotional maturity, i.e. criminals, low-life thugs or the highly passionate, even violent, love interest of the starring character.  Latino women, Latinas, were similarly portrayed when it came to their sexuality, but where as Latino men could be in a position of authority, albeit within an anti-social, criminal setting, Latinas were oftentimes characters with much less authority, such as housemaids, domestic servants or even prostitutes.

Traditionally, even without the usage of these stereotypes, it was rare for a Latino or Latina character in a film to be the star, unless the film was primarily marketed to a Latino audience. Behind the camera, it is still difficult for a Latino film producer, director, screenwriter or cinematographer to have mainstream commercial success.

However, as the social attitudes and biases change, there has been a gradual improvement in film depictions as well as in career opportunities for Latin Americans.

History
The negative stereotyping of Latinos in film relates to the history of Latinos. Mexican Americans were seen by Anglos as uneducated and lacking integrity and thus unworthy of the rights to citizenship. Early films portrayed these negative stereotypes of Mexicans and Mexican Americans, but as time went on these stereotypes expanded to Central and South Americans. In the late 1890s, few Latinos were involved in filmmaking or appeared as actors in films. The Latinos that did appear in films or produced films were from privileged backgrounds. At this time, the late 1890s, filmmaking consisted of silent films. Myrtle Gonzalez and Beatriz Michelena were among the few Latinos to create silent films. In the 1910s and 1920s, a few film production companies rose to dominate the industry, forcing the depletion of Latinos working in film production. It was not until the 1970s that Latinos reemerged in the field of film production.

Silent western films were the first films to feature Latino characters. The Latino characters often played the role of the rebellious "greaser" opposing the white hero. The term "greaser" is used to describe Mexican bandits and other lazy, untrustworthy Mexican characters. Tony the Greaser and The Greaser's Revenge were two movies that capitalized on this storyline. These films helped to start the trend of establishing Latino characters as "others" in contrast to whites. The Mexican government in the 1920s complained and boycotted Hollywood films. These boycotts and complaints led film producers to disassociate negative Latino characters from identification with any particular country. This led to pan-Latino representations which were still negative, just not associated with one particular country.

The mid-1920s led to a few opportunities for Latino actors and actresses. The popularity of the Italian actor Rudolph Valentino, the original "Latin lover", created opportunities for Latino actors and actresses such as Ramón Novarro, Dolores del Río, Lupe Vélez, Carmen Miranda etc. These actors were cast as major roles as passionate Latin lover types and became international stars in silent films. The Latin lover image capitalized on notions that Latinos were innately passionate and sexual. The Latin lover image still exists today along with Latinos being viewed as villains and servants.

Changing times
Just as the population of Latinos is rapidly rising in the United States in the 21st century, Latinos are also emerging (although not as quickly as the population) in media, including motion pictures, both in front of and behind the camera. Mainstream news media conglomerates are finally covering "Latinos in Film" news, and also offer ground-breaking coverage specifically aimed at spotlighting Latinos in film, such as The Huffington Posts Latino Entertainment page. News not only highlights Latino celebrities, but Latino filmmakers of both studio and independent movies. Additionally, a small handful of organizations have emerged in the 2000s that advocate for Latinos rights and opportunity in the field of entertainment in the United States, as well as raising awareness of these rising talents, including the National Association of Latino Independent Producers (NALIP), The Latino Film Fund (LFF) and Edward James Olmos' Latino International Film Institute.
	 
One of the first movies that portrayed Latinos not as stereotypes, but as regular families with their strengths and weaknesses was Mi Familia. The film won the Latino magazine's best picture of the 1995. It starred Edward James Olmos, Jimmy Smits and Jennifer Lopez.
	 
Jennifer Lopez appeared in the Latino magazine's list of Hollywood's most powerful along with producer Nely Galán, writer–producer Josefina López, and Cameron Diaz. She also starred in movies such as Jack alongside Robin Williams, Anaconda as a female lead, and Money Train with Wesley Snipes and Woody Harrelson.
	 
Moctesuma Esparza is a famous Latino producer who is best known for Selena, which grossed $21.7 million in its first ten days. He started his career in the 1980s with movies like Gettysburg, The Battle of Gregorio Cortez and The Milagro Beanfield War.

Things seem to be changing for Latinos in Hollywood as many Latinos enter and excel in the television and film industry. With movies such as Mi Familia and Selena making a respectable showing at the box office, the future is looking bright for Latinos in film.

Latino actors

Latina actresses

References

Lists of film actors